Michael Jackson's Boys (broadcast in the U.S as a Primetime Live special titled, Michael Jackson's Secret World,) Is a 2005 TV documentary made by Tiger Aspect Productions, and first aired in the UK on Channel 4 in January 2005 narrated by Mark Strong and later on ABC in the U.S. in February 2005 with narration by Martin Bashir, the U.S. version also featured addition interviews not shown in the British version that increased the length of the documentary for an additional hour. The documentary was released just prior to the Trial of Michael Jackson, and it focuses on a "supposed history" of Michael Jackson's interest in boys.

The film consists mostly of new interviews with people close to Jackson and archive footage. Some of the participants were given "compensation" for their interviews. The U.S. version aired a disclaimer saying that while some of the interviews in the British version received compensation, no payment had been rendered for the interviews in the additional hour of footage.

Cast

Reception 

Susan Hidalgo and Robert G. Weiner of Texas Tech University assume that the film "uses hearsay, insinuations, and assumptions" and effects and music for creating "a sense of danger and fear".

See also 
 Square One: Michael Jackson, 2019 documentary about how and why Jackson was accused in 1993
 Michael Jackson: Chase the Truth, 2019 documentary presenting evidence for Jackson's innocence
 Leaving Neverland, 2019 documentary film about the alleged experiences of Wade Robson and James Safechuck with Michael Jackson
 Neverland Firsthand: Investigating the Michael Jackson Documentary, 2019 documentary showcasing evidence against Leaving Neverland
 Michael Jackson's Dangerous Liaisons, a 2010 book by paedophile activist Tom O'Carroll

References

External links 
 

2005 films
2005 documentary films
British documentary films
Documentary films about Michael Jackson
Works about the Michael Jackson sexual abuse allegations
2000s English-language films
2000s British films